Rohit Shetty (born 14 March 1974) is an Indian film director, stuntman, writer, producer and television host who works in Hindi cinema. He is one of the most recognised film director of Hindi Cinema. His movies are often mix genres of action, comedy and masala films.

His breakthrough came with the first installment of comedy film franchise Golmaal,  Golmaal (2006) starring Ajay Devgn and Arshad Warsi, which became sleeper hit. Further subsequent other successful films in franchise included Golmaal Returns (2008) and Golmaal 3 (2010), which became one of the highest-grossing film of the year. 
 
Shetty returned in action genre with Singham (2011) after eight years of his debut action thriller Zameen. It also starred Ajay Devgn in lead, the film turned out one of the highest grosser of the year. Later on, it expanded in Cop Universe franchise with other successful films such as  Singham Returns (2014), Simmba (2018), Sooryavanshi (2021). His other notable success includes Bol Bachchan (2012), Chennai Express (2013) starring Shah Rukh Khan, which became the highest grossing Hindi film surpassing 3 Idiots at that time and Dilwale (2015).
 
Apart from film directing, he has also hosts the stunt-based adventure show Fear Factor: Khatron Ke Khiladi since 2014.

Early life 
Shetty was born to M. B. Shetty and Ratna, a Bollywood junior artist, who has acted in Hindi and Kannada films. He has four siblings.

Career

1991–2002: Early work 

Shetty began his career at the age of 17 as an assistant director in Ajay Devgn's first film Phool Aur Kaante. He then worked with Devgn in Suhaag (where he was a body double for Akshay Kumar who was its second main hero) and Haqeeqat, and with Kumar in Zulmi.  He then joined the Devgn starrers Pyaar To Hona Hi Tha, Hindustan Ki Kasam and Raju Chacha.

2003–2009: Directorial debut and breakthrough 

Shetty debuted as an independent director in 2003 with the Devgn starrer Zameen, an average grosser, before he rose to fame in 2006 when he directed the first part of Devgn's cult comedy series Golmaal that became his first hit. His next two directorials—the comic thriller Sunday and the successful sequel of Golmaal named Golmaal Returns (both featuring Devgn)–were released theatrically in 2008 followed by All the Best: Fun Begins in 2009.

2010–present: Commercial success 

The third part of Golmaal series titled Golmaal 3 (again starring Devgn) that opened theatrically in 2010 ended up as Shetty's first and an surprising blockbuster that entered 100 Crore Club domestically. Continuing his collaborations with Devgn, Shetty begun his Cop Universe in 2011 through his action film Singham (that saw Devgn portray a police inspector fighting against corruption) and directed the comedy Bol Bachchan (also featuring Abhishek Bachchan) in 2012; both films were super hits and crossed 100 Crore Club domestically.

Shetty's Chennai Express, starring Shah Rukh Khan and Deepika Padukone, was released on 9 August 2013. Chennai Express became the highest-grossing Bollywood film in the domestic market. The film earned over US$17.4 million to become the third-highest-grossing Bollywood film overseas. The film also set a number of box office records, for the highest opening-day gross, highest paid preview, highest single-day gross, biggest opening weekend, highest opening week and the fastest film to reach 100 crore and 2 billion in the domestic market.

Shetty has played the judge of the television show Comedy Circus.

In 2014, Shetty directed Singham Returns with Ajay Devgn, a sequel to his 2011 film Singham. He was also a part of the fifth season of television stunt game show Fear Factor: Khatron Ke Khiladi in 2014 as the host taking over from the previous host Akshay Kumar. In 2014, he turned into a producer with Singham Returns, co-producing the film under his banner Rohit Shetty Productions. He directed Dilwale with Sharukh Khan and Kajol, which was a moderate box-office success. He reprised his role as host in season 6 and 8–11 of Fear Factor: Khatron Ke Khiladi.

Shetty next directed Golmaal Again, the fourth film of the Golmaal series. The film, starring Ajay Devgn and Parineeti Chopra in the lead roles, was released in October 2017, and received mixed reviews.  It became the highest grossing Hindi film in 2017, the first Hindi blockbuster of 2017, as well as the highest grossing Diwali release of all time. He directed then directed the 2018 action comedy, Simmba, starring Ranveer Singh, Sara Ali Khan and Sonu Sood in the lead roles, with Ajay Devgn in a guest appearance as Bajirao Singham.

Shetty directed another feature in the Cop Universe, Sooryavanshi, starring Akshay Kumar, Katrina Kaif and Jackie Shroff, which was released during Diwali in 2021. It was the first major release from Hindi Cinema after lockdown due to COVID-19, the film became highest grossing Hindi film of the year.  Shetty will be making his OTT debut with Indian Police Force, starring Sidharth Malhotra for Amazon Prime Video.

Filmography

Film

Web series

Television

Awards and nominations

References

External links 

 
 

1974 births
Living people
Telstra People's Choice Award winners
21st-century Indian film directors
Mangaloreans
Film directors from Mumbai
Hindi-language film directors
Tulu people